Kąkolewnica  is a village in Radzyń Podlaski County, Lublin Voivodeship, in eastern Poland. It is the seat of the gmina (administrative district) called Gmina Kąkolewnica.

Kąkolewnica became a unified village on 1 January 2011, formed from the formerly separate villages of Kąkolewnica Północna, Kąkolewnica Południowa, Kąkolewnica Wschodnia (north, south and east Kąkolewnica) and Rudnik.

World War II history
Kąkolewnica was the location of the communist killing fields at Uroczysko Baran – known in Poland as the "Little Katyn" – perpetrated during the advancement of the Red Army across the Polish territories in 1944–1945.

See also
Lublin Land cuisine

References

Kakolewnica
Lesser Poland
Lublin Voivodeship (1474–1795)
Siedlce Governorate
Lublin Governorate
Lublin Voivodeship (1919–1939)